Sofia Papadopoulou (born 19 November 1983 in Athens) is a Greek sailor. She started sailing at the age of 5. She won the bronze medal in the women's Yngling class with Sofia Bekatorou and Virginia Kravarioti at the 2008 Summer Olympics in Beijing, People's Republic of China.

References

External links
 
 
 

1983 births
Living people
Greek female sailors (sport)
Sailors (sport) from Athens
Olympic sailors of Greece
Olympic bronze medalists for Greece
Olympic medalists in sailing
Sailors at the 2008 Summer Olympics – Yngling
Medalists at the 2008 Summer Olympics